The 1981 NCAA Division I Men's Soccer Tournament was the 23rd organized men's college soccer tournament by the National Collegiate Athletic Association, to determine the top college soccer team in the United States. The Connecticut Huskies won their first national title by defeating the Alabama A&M Bulldogs in the championship game, 2–1, after one overtime period. The final match was played on December 6, 1981, in Palo Alto, California, at Stanford Stadium.

Bracket

Note
San Diego State and Eastern Illinois had their results vacated by the NCAA.

Championship Rounds

Third-Place Final

Final

See also  
 1981 NCAA Division II Soccer Championship
 1981 NCAA Division III Soccer Championship
 1981 NAIA Soccer Championship

References 

NCAA Division I Men's Soccer Tournament seasons
Tournament
NCAA Division I Men's Soccer Tournament
NCAA Division I Men's Soccer Tournament